Wanju County (Wanju-gun) is a county in North Jeolla Province, South Korea. It almost entirely surrounds Jeonju. This county should not be confused with Wonju, in Gangwon-do.

History 
○ Mahan Baekje Kingdom Wansanju 16th year of King Gyeongdeok of Silla renamed to Jeonju 
○ 1935.10. 1 Separation of Wanju-gun 
○ 1957.11. 6 Entry of Chopo and part Ujeon-myeon to Jeonju 
○ 1983. 2. 15 Entry of part Sanggwan-myeon to Jeonju 
○ 1987. 1. 1 Entry of Jochon-eup to Jeonju 
○ 1989. 1. 1 Entry of Yongjin-myeon and part Gui-myeon to Jeonju 
○ 1990. 8. 1 Entry of part Iseo to Jeonju 
○ 1990. 12 Revise of substructure in Sanggwan-myeon and Soyang-myeon ri

Ancient Times
In three Han States age, it was the territory of Mahan and in 555 wideokwang2*) wansan week was installed but in 565 wansan week was abolished. After (king Uija 20) Baekje in 660 collapsed, it was amalgamated into Shilla and (the Sinmunwang 5) wansan main part in 685 was installed. And at this time, it got to develop to the center of the local administration. It was changed to (king Kyongdok 16) Jeonju in 757. The wansan feeling was installed and it was highly regarded as the center of the military. (the genuineness queen 6) Kyon Hwon in 892 established the Latter Baekje in the wansan and until (the King Taejo 19) in 936 collapsed, It became the territory of the Latter Baekje for 45 years.

Goryeo
In 936(19th year of King Taejo) Jeonju changed to Annamdaedoho-bu and in 940(23rd year of King Taejo) it restored back to Jeonju. In 993, Wansan was corrected to Seunghwa and put Jeoldoanmusa, and in 995, it was named Sunui-gun that belong to Gangnamdo when dividing the nation into 10do 12ju. In 1005(8th year of King Mokjong) Jeoldosa of Jeonju was dispatched, and in 1018(9th year of King Hyeonjong) was promoted to Annamdaedoho-bu during the nationwide district system reform, but in 1022 it was renamed back to Jeonjumok. In 1355(4th year of King Gongmin) although Jung Ji-Sang who was an Allyeongsa of Jeolla Province was degraded to Bugo by the incident when he imprisoned Yasabulhwa who was a Wonuisasin, the year after he was raised back to Wansanbu.

Joseon
This province where Joseon had been founded in 1392(1st year of King Taejo) was promoted to Wansanyusu-bu due to its importance as Taejo's hometown, and in 1403(3rd year of King Taejo) it was renamed Jeonju-bu and unchanged until the end of Joseon, but its territory was reduced than that of the Goryeo.

Modern times
In 1914 Jeonju-gun was established as Gosan-gun became united, and in 1935 as Jeonju-eup was promoted to Jeonju-bu, Jeonju-gun was renamed Wanju-gun which took control of 15-myeon.

Present
In 1956 Samnye-myeon was promoted to eup, and in 1957 Chopo.Ujeon-myeon and Jochon Yongjin.part Sanggwan-myeon was transferred to Jeonju. Part Chopo-myeon was transferred to Samnye-up and Yongjin-myeon, and part Ujeon-myeon was transferred to Gui-myeon, in 1966 Gyeongcheon branch office was built in Unju-myeon, and in 1973 Bongdong-myeon was promoted to eup, Iksan-gun Onsuri Volcano Village was transferred to Samnye-eup Samnye-ri, part Sanjeong-ri of Yongjin-eup was transferred to Jeonju Ua-dong. In 1983, Sanggwan-myeon Daeseong-ri, Saekjang-ri and part Sanjeong-ri of Yongjin-myeon was transferred to Jeonju, part Dodeok-ri of Baekgu-myeon in Gimje-gun was transferred to Jochon-myeon. In 1985 Jochon-myeon was promoted to eup, in 1987 to Jeonju, and in 1989 Gyeongcheon branch office of Unju-myeon was promoted to Gyeongcheon-myeon. In 1990, Iseo-myeon Jung-ri. Sangnim-ri was transferred to Jeonju. In 1994 part Geumpyeong-ri of Yongji-myeon in Gimje-gun was transferred to Iseo-myeon.

Gallery

Festival 

Wild Food Festival

It is the festival which feels old memory including the river-fishing, wildness, homesickness, etc. based on the Food of be: healthy the Region which 'the Local food 1 bunji' Wanju is pushing ahead in the nature and which it experiences. In the stream side, the loach miscellaneous game, etc. is experienced to catch the grasshopper up to from the river-fishing catching the fish up to and it can bake and can eat in the stove directly.
With Wanju's nature as background, enjoy a variety in experiencing food by traditional method to wild animal·plant.

Period: Every September~October 
Location: Wanju-gun Gosan Recreational Forest and Unitary Auto Camping

Samnye Strawberry Festival

Since Samnye strawberry is renowned nationwide for its good quality, the festival is crowded with people who come to taste it at the end of every March. Promotional events as experiencing strawberry harvest, making strawberry cake and strawberry Injeolmi, planting strawberry flowerpot, etc. are held, where chemical-free and environmentally friendly strawberry can be tasted and bought.

Period: Around every end of March 
Location: Youth Training Center, Samnye-eup, Wanju-gun

Twin towns – sister cities
Wanju is twinned with:
  Seodaemun-gu, South Korea
  Seocho-gu, South Korea
  Chilgok, South Korea
  Gunpo, South Korea
  Huai'an, China

External links
Government of Wanju County

 
Counties of North Jeolla Province